Timothy Dudley-Smith  (born 26 December 1926) is a retired bishop of the Church of England and a noted English hymnwriter. He has written around 400 hymns, including "Tell Out, my Soul".

Life, education and ministry

Dudley-Smith was born on 26 December 1926 in Manchester, England, to Phyllis and Arthur Dudley-Smith. His father was a schoolteacher. He was educated at Tonbridge School before studying maths and then theology at Pembroke College, Cambridge. After graduating in 1947, he began his ordination training at Ridley Hall, Cambridge. He was ordained deacon in 1950 and priest in 1951 by Christopher Chavasse, the Bishop of Rochester.

After ordination, Dudley-Smith served as an honorary chaplain to Chavasse, as well as head of the Cambridge University Mission in Bermondsey, South London. In 1955, he was appointed editorial secretary of the Evangelical Alliance and editor of the new Crusade magazine, created after Billy Graham's 1954 London mission. Dudley-Smith also began serving with the Church Pastoral Aid Society, serving as assistant secretary from 1959, then as secretary until 1973. He served as Archdeacon of Norwich from 1973 to 1981 and as Bishop of Thetford from 1981 to 1991. He also served as president of the Evangelical Alliance from 1987 to 1992. He was chairman of the governors of Monkton Combe School from 1992 to 1997.

He married Arlette MacDonald in 1959. They were married for 48 years until her death in 2007; they had one son and two daughters. His son, James, is also ordained in the Church of England, and currently serves as rector of St John's Church, Yeovil.

Dudley-Smith has been part of what has been described as a British "hymn explosion" since World War II.

Honours

Dudley-Smith is a member and honorary vice-president of the Hymn Society of Great Britain and Ireland; he has also been awarded fellowships from the Hymn Society in the United States and Canada and the Royal School of Church Music. In 2003, he was appointed an Officer of the Order of the British Empire "for services to hymnody". In July 2009 he was awarded an honorary Doctor of Divinity degree by Durham University.

Selected works

References

External links
Official website
Hymn Society of Great Britain and Ireland
Hymn Society in the United States and Canada

1926 births
Living people
Clergy from Manchester
Alumni of Pembroke College, Cambridge
Alumni of Ridley Hall, Cambridge
People educated at Tonbridge School
Anglican suffragan bishops in the Diocese of Norwich
Christian hymnwriters
English hymnwriters
Evangelical Anglican bishops
Bishops of Thetford
Archdeacons of Norwich
Officers of the Order of the British Empire
20th-century Church of England bishops
Governors of Monkton Combe School